Jakie Quartz (born Jacqueline Cuchet, 31 July 1955) is a French singer. Her biggest hit singles in France were "Mise au point" (1983, covered by Leslie in 2007 and Quentin Mosimann in 2008), "Vivre ailleurs" (1986, #11 in France, produced by Secret Service) and "À la vie à l'amour" (1987, #30 in France and #55 in the UK Singles Chart)

Discography

Albums
 Revue et corrigée (musical) - 1982
 Mise au point - 1982
 Alerte à la blonde - 1984
 Jour et nuit - 1986
 Emotion au pluriel - 1987
 Jakie Quartz - 1990

Compilations
 Bravo à Jakie Quart - 1990
 Présent Passé - 1995
 Jakie Quartz - 2003

Singles
 "Histoire éphémère" - 1981
 "Mise au point" - 1983
 "Amour exil" - 1983
 "Histoire sans paroles" - 1984
 "Mal de vivre" - 1984
 "Jeu dangereux" - 1985
 "Vivre ailleurs" - 1986
 "À la vie à l'amour" - 1987
 "EmotIon" - 1987
 "Amour blessé" - 1988
 "Non mais qu'est-ce que tu crois ?" - 1989
 "A la vie à l'amour" (remix) - 1989
 "Mais dis-moi" - 1990
 "Tout ce que tu voudras" - 1990
 "Comme un rêve" - 1992
 "Le meilleur de toi-même" - 1995
 "Que sont-ils devenus ? (la photo)" - 1996
 "Si demain" - 2003

References

1955 births
French-language singers
Living people
Quartz, Jakie